Conraua alleni or Allen's slippery frog is a species of frogs in the family Conrauidae found in the Ivory Coast, Guinea, Liberia, and Sierra Leone, along with a single outlying site in the Sui River Forest Reserve, Ghana. Its natural habitats are subtropical or tropical moist lowland forest, subtropical or tropical moist montane forest, and rivers.

It is an aquatic frog that is present in rainforest streams that flow both slowly and fast; the frogs are found in the relatively still areas of the streams.

It is threatened by habitat loss.

References

Conraua
Amphibians described in 1927
Frogs of Africa
Amphibians of West Africa
Taxa named by Thomas Barbour
Taxa named by Arthur Loveridge
Taxonomy articles created by Polbot